is an Aten near-Earth asteroid around  in diameter. The glare of the Sun had masked the approach of the asteroid as it passed closest approach to Earth on 11 August 2014. The asteroid now has a 6-year observation arc and a well-determined orbit. It also makes close approaches to Venus.

2020 
 was less than 90 degrees from the Sun until September 2020 when it still had a very faint apparent magnitude of 24. The asteroid was recovered on 22 November 2020 by Mt. Lemmon Survey. The asteroid came to opposition (opposite the Sun in the sky) on 12 December 2020 when it had a solar elongation of 149 degrees and a magnitude of 18. It reached a peak brightness on 23 December 2020 at magnitude 16.4, which is still fainter than Pluto.

The 2020 close approach distance is known with an accuracy of roughly ±20 km.

Notes

References

External links 
 
 
 

501647
501647
Near-Earth objects in 2014
20201225
20140922